Shri Govindram Seksaria Institute of Technology and Science (SGSITS), formerly known as Govindram Seksaria Technological Institute (GSTI), is an institute of technology located in Indore, Madhya Pradesh, India. It is an autonomous institution funded by the Government of Madhya Pradesh, India. 

SGSITS is an autonomous institute for academic and administrative purposes, it is a part of the Rajiv Gandhi Proudyogiki Vishwavidyalaya and its degrees are issued by this university.

History

Established in 1952, SGSITS was initially known as "Shri Govindram Seksaria Kala Bhavan". The institute came into being as a result of the desire expressed by the Prime Minister Jawaharlal Nehru to a group of leading industrialists of Indore for establishing a technical institute.   
An industrialist of the town, Seth Shri Kudilaji Seksaria, responded by donating an initial amount for starting the institute in the name of his late father Seth Shri Govindram Seksaria, who is famously known as the Cotton King of India.

In 1956 it was converted to a degree college with a course in Civil Engineering and its name was changed to Govindram Seksaria Technological Institute (GSTI).

With the introduction of M.Sc. courses in Applied Sciences, the name of the institute was changed to its present name. In 1989 the institute was granted autonomous status by the University Grants Commission and the AICTE.

The Department of Management Studies was established in the year 2012.

Campus
The campus spreads over 35 acres and is located in Indore.

Academic departments
The institute offers 10 undergraduate, 22 postgraduate courses with an annual intake of 720 and 459 students respectively. 
It also offers Ph.D. Programs under QIP in all branches of Engineering & Sciences (except Biomedical Engineering, Information Technology and MBA). In addition, 4 part-time undergraduate and 2 part-time postgraduate courses are offered for working professionals with Engineering Diploma. SGSITS is the best college in Madhya Pradesh after IIT and NIT.

Teaching and related activities of the institute are taken care of by different departments, centers, and cells of the institute. The departments are as follows:

Departments 

 Engineering:
 Biomedical engineering
 Civil Engineering and Applied Mechanics
 Computer Engineering
 Electrical Engineering
 Electronics and Telecommunication Engineering
 Electronics and Instrumentation Engineering
 Information Technology
 Industrial and Production Engineering
 Mechanical Engineering
Science:
 Physics: 
 Applied Physics & Optoelectronics
 Chemistry:
 Applied Chemistry
 Mathematics
 Applied Mathematics & Computational Sciences
 Management Studies
 Pharmacy
 Industrial Pharmacy
 Pharmaceutical Chemistry
 Humanities and Social Sciences
 Computer Technology and Applications

Student Activities

Every year the Institute organizes cultural events for the students in both the semesters. Apart from this there are a large number of hobby clubs which conduct their activities throughout the year.

The academic session starts with a fresher’s day, “Aavahan”. This program is exclusively designed for the fresh students joining the Institute. In this program, the fresher’s get an opportunity of getting introduced to the Director of the Institute and Deans, along with the Professor In charge of cultural and literary affairs. The students listen to the orientation lectures of the Director, Dean of Student Welfare, Dean of Academics and Professor I/c Cultural and Literary Affairs. A cultural program is organized on this occasion. This program generally includes various events of music, drama, compering and inter branch competition.

In the next semester, the Institute hosts a Techno-Cultural event, “Aayaam”. This program hosts large number of events. Nearly 1500–2000 students take part in this event.

The program begins with “Gold Medal Award Ceremony”. This prestigious ceremony is held to honour the meritorious students of the Institute. In all 10 Gold Medals (K.G. Seksaria Medals) are conferred to ten toppers of the different branches of Engineering and Pharmacy. Apart from this the Institute also confers about 8 to 10 gold and silver medals and certificates Instituted by various individuals and organizations. After the conclusion of the gold medal award ceremony, the other program spanning up to 3 days begin. The major programs included in Aayaam are open movie theater, nukkad natak, robotics competition, programming competition, bridge design competition, health camp and blood donation camp, circuit design competition, student paper presentations, art exhibition, rangoli competition, marathon, food stalls and games, and cultural program of the students.

Clubs 
The Institute has many student hobby clubs. These clubs host a number of events during the year and provide an opportunity to the students to pursue their hobbies. Few of them are listed below:
Team GSRacers (BAJA Segment)
Team GSMotorsports (Formula Segment)

Pratibimb
CodeFoster
Computer Club
Magazine and Literary Committee
TRIVIM
SAE
E-Cell
Club Ojaswa
Club Kshitij
Ingenious
GS Production House
Sparkle

Centres and Cells 
The Centres and Cells available are: 
 Computer Centre
 Centre for Continuing Education Programme
 Entrepreneurship Development Cell
 Training and Placement Cell
 Central Workshop and Management Cell
 Center for Nanotechnology
 Centre for Lasers and Fiber Optics
 Centre for VLSI Designs Entrepreneurship Development
 Cell Center for Advanced Automation
 Centre for Industry-Institute Interaction
 Remote Sensing Cell
 Center for Innovation, Design and Incubation (CIDI)

Notable alumni

 Deepak B. Phatak (Padma Shri)
 Digvijaya Singh
 Bala Bachchan
 Sushil Doshi, Journalist, Writer, Sports Commentator awarded with Padma Shri

References

External links 
 

All India Council for Technical Education
Engineering colleges in Madhya Pradesh
Universities and colleges in Indore
Science and technology in Indore
Educational institutions established in 1952
1952 establishments in India